The 1979 Copa América Finals were the final series to determine the champion of the 1979 Copa América, the 31st edition of the continental competition. 

The final was played as a two-legged tie, with the team earning more points being the champion. After Paraguay and Chile won one game each finished tied on points, a play-off at a neutral venue was required.

The first leg was held on November 28 at Defensores del Chaco in Asunción, where Paraguay won 3–0. The second leg was held at Estadio Nacional in Santiago on December 5, where Chile won 1–0. 

As both teams were tied 2–2 on points, a play-off match was held on December 11 in Vélez Sarsfield's venue, José Amalfitani Stadium in Buenos Aires. 

After the play-off match finished in a 0–0 tie after extra time had expired, Paraguay were declared champions on aggregate (3–1), therefore winning its second Copa América title. 

Paraguay won the competition in the same year that a club from the country, Olimpia, won its first Copa Libertadores. A number of Olimpia players formed the basis of the national team that won the Copa América title, including Alicio Solalinde, Hugo Talavera, Roberto Paredes, Evaristo Isasi and Carlos Kiese.

Qualified teams

Venues

Route to the final 

Notes
 Paraguay won 4–3 on aggregate
 Chile won 2–1 on aggregate

Match details

First leg 

|}

Second leg

Play-off

Paraguay won 3–1 on aggregate

References

1979 Copa América
1979 in South American football
1979 in Chilean football
1979 in Paraguayan football
Chile national football team matches
Paraguay national football team matches
November 1979 sports events in South America
December 1979 sports events in South America
Copa América finals